Zion Episcopal Church may refer to:

in the United States
(by state)
 Zion Episcopal Church (Talbotton, Georgia), listed on the NRHP in Georgia
 Zion Episcopal Church Complex and Harmony Cemetery, listed on the NRHP in New York
 Zion Episcopal Church (Douglaston, New York)
 Zion Episcopal Church (Palmyra, New York), listed on the NRHP in New York
 Zion Episcopal Church (Wappingers, New York)
 Zion Episcopal Church (Washington, North Carolina), listed on the NRHP in North Carolina
 Zion Episcopal Church (Monroeville, Ohio), listed on the NRHP in Ohio
 Zion Episcopal Church (Charles Town, West Virginia)